USA-199, also known as GPS IIR-18(M), GPS IIRM-5 and GPS SVN-57, is an American navigation satellite which forms part of the Global Positioning System. It was the fifth of eight Block IIRM satellites to be launched, and the eighteenth of twenty one Block IIR satellites overall. It was built by Lockheed Martin, using the AS-4000 satellite bus.

USA-199 was launched at 20:04:00 UTC on 20 December 2007, atop a Delta II carrier rocket, flight number D331, flying in the 7925-9.5 configuration. The launch took place from Space Launch Complex 17A at the Cape Canaveral Air Force Station, and placed USA-199 into a transfer orbit. The satellite raised itself into medium Earth orbit using a Star-37FM apogee motor.

It is used to broadcast the PRN 29 signal, and operates in slot 1 of plane C of the GPS constellation. As of 2012 it remains in service.

References

Spacecraft launched in 2007
GPS satellites
USA satellites